

Hans-Gustav Felber (July 8, 1889 – March 8, 1962) was a general in the Wehrmacht of Nazi Germany during World War II.

Biography 
From 15 October 1939 Felber was the chief of staff of the 2nd Army, becoming chief of staff of the Army Group Centre in February 1940. 
On 25 October 1940 he was given the command of the XIII Army Corps with which he fought in the Soviet Union. In April 1942, he was transferred to the Höheres Kommando z. b. V. XXXXV, later renumbered to LXXXIII Army Corps and Army Group Felber, stationed in France.
On 15 August 1943, he became Militärbefehlshaber Südost, commanding all German troops in Serbia, Croatia and Greece.
From 26 September to 27 October 1944 he headed the Army Group Serbia.

On 6 December 1944 he led the Corps Group Felber, which was renamed XIII Army Corps after the original XIII Corps had been disbanded following their crushing defeat in the Lvov–Sandomierz Offensive. From 22 February to 25 March 1945 Felber was the commander of the 7th Army.

Awards

 Knight's Cross of the Iron Cross on 17 September 1941 as General der Infanterie and commander of XIII. Armee-Korps

References

Citations

Bibliography

(Russian) Kto byl kto v Tretyem reykhe. Biografichesky entsiklopedichesky slovar, Moscow, 2003
 
 

1889 births
1962 deaths
People from Hesse-Nassau
German Army generals of World War II
Generals of Infantry (Wehrmacht)
German Army personnel of World War I
Prussian Army personnel
Recipients of the Knight's Cross of the Iron Cross
Recipients of the clasp to the Iron Cross, 1st class
Reichswehr personnel
Military personnel from Wiesbaden